During World War II, Egbert White (1894–1976) had a major role in establishing newspapers for US soldiers that were written and edited by enlisted men, not by the Army top command. He had served with the Stars and Stripes newspaper during World War I and between the wars worked in advertising.

Within a month after Pearl Harbor, he proposed a magazine by soldiers for soldiers to General Frederick Osborn. This proposal was accepted, and became Yank magazine. He accepted a commission as lieutenant colonel.

White was removed from the Yank staff in 1942 by General Osborn and was ordered overseas to serve with the Stars and Stripes newspaper. He was in charge of the North African/Mediterranean edition of Stars and Stripes from its beginning in December 1942 to mid 1944. He insisted that this newspaper too should be for the enlisted men not the high command.
Bill Mauldin began drawing cartoons for the Stars and Stripes while White was in charge of it. White encouraged Mauldin to accept offers to syndicate his cartoons to US newspapers, and helped Mauldin find a literary agent.

In mid 1944, he was sent home because he wanted to run excerpts from US newspapers about the 1944 Presidential campaign in Stars and Stripes, and the army command forbade this.

References

American male journalists
20th-century American journalists
1894 births
1976 deaths
American war correspondents
Mass media of the military of the United States
American military personnel of World War I
American military personnel of World War II